Samuel Tshiayima Nombe (born 22 October 1998) is an English professional footballer who plays as a forward for  club Exeter City.

Club career

Milton Keynes Dons
Nombe joined Milton Keynes Dons academy at under-11 level, and on 12 May 2017 signed professional terms with the club, alongside fellow academy graduate Hugo Logan.

On 8 August 2017, Nombe made his competitive professional debut for the club, coming on as an 80th-minute substitute for Ryan Seager during an EFL Cup first round away win over Forest Green Rovers. Nombe made his league debut four days later on 12 August 2017, coming on as a 72nd-minute substitute for Robbie Muirhead in a 1–0 away defeat to Blackpool.

On 9 February 2018, Nombe joined National League South club Oxford City on loan until the end of the 2017/18 season. During his brief loan spell, Nombe scored 6 goals in 9 appearances for the club before being recalled to Milton Keynes Dons on 23 April 2018. On 18 May 2018, following a productive first season as a professional, Nombe signed a contract extension keeping him at the club until summer 2019, which was later extended until June 2020 on 31 May 2018. On 30 October 2018 Nombe re-joined Oxford City on a short-term loan until 1 January 2019, before joining National League club Maidenhead United on 11 January 2019 until the end of the season.

On 16 October 2020, Nombe joined Championship club Luton Town for the remainder of the 2020–21 season with an "intent and option" for a permanent transfer. At the conclusion of the season, Luton Town opted not to make Nombe's transfer permanent following limited first team opportunities in which he made only 11 league appearances.

Exeter City
On 5 July 2021, Nombe joined League Two club Exeter City for an undisclosed fee, signing a three-year contract. He scored his first goal for City on 18 September in a 2–0 home win over Sutton United, his effort minutes prior being chalked down as a Sutton own goal. Exeter secured promotion back to League One that season, with Nombe scoring 8 goals despite being injured for a large part of the season.

Career statistics

Honours
Exeter City
League Two runner-up: 2021–22

Individual
Milton Keynes Dons Young Player of the Year: 2019–20

References

External links

Living people
1998 births
English footballers
Association football forwards
Milton Keynes Dons F.C. players
Oxford City F.C. players
Maidenhead United F.C. players
Luton Town F.C. players
English Football League players
National League (English football) players
Exeter City F.C. players
Black British sportspeople